La Madeleine is a commune in the Nord department in northern France.

It is a suburb of the city of Lille, bordering it on its north side.

Heraldry

History
In 1944, Pierre Marchant and Lucien Olivier, two members of the French resistance from La Madeleine, were killed near Hill 60 (Ypres) by Germans.

Population

Education
Schools in the commune:
 Public preschools (écoles maternelles): Anne Frank, Courbet, d'Hallendre, du Moulin - Alphonse Daudet, and Gaston Leclercq
 Public elementary schools: Victor Hugo, Louise de Bettignies, Kléber, and Edmond Rostand
 Private preschools and elementary schools:  Institution Jeanne d’Arc and Ecole Sainte-Geneviève
 One public junior high school, Collège Flandre
 One private junior high school, Collège privé Saint-Jean
 One public senior high school, Lycée Valentine Labbé

The École Japonaise du Nord-Pas-de-Calais (ノール＝パ・ド・カレー日本人学校 Nōsu Pa do Karē Nihonjin Gakkō), a part-time Japanese supplementary school, is held in La Madeleine.

See also
Communes of the Nord department

References

External links

 Official website 

Madeleine
French Flanders